Naresh Kumar (born 17 November 1965) is an Indian wrestler. He competed in the men's freestyle 74 kg at the 1988 Summer Olympics.

References

1965 births
Living people
Indian male sport wrestlers
Olympic wrestlers of India
Wrestlers at the 1988 Summer Olympics
Place of birth missing (living people)
Wrestlers at the 1986 Asian Games
Asian Games competitors for India
Recipients of the Arjuna Award
20th-century Indian people